Ann Haesebrouck (born 18 October 1963 in Bruges, Belgium) is a rower from  Belgium.

She competed for Belgium in the 1984 Summer Olympics held in Los Angeles, United States in the single sculls event where she finished in third place. she returned to the 1988 Summer Olympics where she finished sixth as part of the Belgian Quadruple sculls team and again in 1992 Summer Olympics where she finished ninth as part of the Belgian double sculls team.

References
Sports-reference

1963 births
Living people
Belgian female rowers
Olympic rowers of Belgium
Olympic bronze medalists for Belgium
Rowers at the 1984 Summer Olympics
Rowers at the 1988 Summer Olympics
Rowers at the 1992 Summer Olympics
Flemish sportspeople
Olympic medalists in rowing
Sportspeople from Bruges
Medalists at the 1984 Summer Olympics
20th-century Belgian women